This is a list of moths of the family Noctuidae that are found in Turkey. It also acts as an index to the species articles and forms part of the full List of moths of Turkey.

Abrostola agnorista Dufay, 1956
Abrostola asclepiadis Lang, 1789
Abrostola clarissa Staudinger, 1900
Abrostola trigemina Werneburg, 1864
Abrostola triplasia (Linnaeus, 1758)
Acantholeucania loreyi Duponchel, 1827
Acantholipes regularis (Hübner, [1813])
Acontia lucida (Hufnagel, 1766)
Acontia titania (Esper, [1798])
Acontia urania Frivaldsky, 1835
Acrapex taurica Staudinger, 1900
Acronicta aceris (Linnaeus, 1758)
Acronicta alni (Linnaeus, 1758)
Acronicta leporina (Linnaeus, 1758)
Acronicta pasiphae Draudt, 1936
Acronicta psi (Linnaeus, 1758)
Acronicta tridens ([Denis & Schiffermüller], 1775)
Actebia praecox (Linnaeus, 1758)
Actinotia hypericii (Fabricius, 1787)
Actinotia polyodon Clerck, 1759
Actinotia radiosa (Esper, [1804])
Aedia funesta (Esper, [1786])
Aedia leucomelas (Linnaeus, 1758)
Aedophron phlebophora Lederer, 1858
Aedophron rhodites Eversmann, 1851
Agrapha accentifera Lefebvre, 1827
Agrochola pistacina Goeze, 1781
Agrotis biconica Kollar, 1844
Agrotis cinerea ([Denis & Schiffermüller], 1775)
Agrotis clavis (Hufnagel, 1766)
Agrotis desertorum Boisduval, 1840
Agrotis exclamationis (Linnaeus, 1758)
Agrotis grossi Hacker & Kuhna, 1986
Agrotis haifae Staudinger, 1897
Agrotis ipsilon (Hufnagel, 1766)
Agrotis ripae (Hübner, [1813])
Agrotis scruposa Draudt, 1936
Agrotis segetum ([Denis & Schiffermüller], 1775)
Agrotis trux (Hübner, [1824])
Aletia albipuncta (Fabricius, 1787)
Aletia alopecuri Boisduval, 1840
Aletia congrua (Hübner, [1817])
Aletia conigera ([Denis & Schiffermüller], 1775)
Aletia deserticola Bartel, 1903
Aletia ferrago (Fabricius, 1787)
Aletia flavostigma Bremer, 1861
Aletia impura (Hübner, [1808])
Aletia l-album (Linnaeus, 1767)
Aletia languida Walker, 1858
Aletia pallens (Linnaeus, 1758)
Aletia prominens Walker, 1856
Aletia pudorina ([Denis & Schiffermüller], 1775)
Aletia sassanidica Hacker, 1986
Aletia scirpi Duponchel, 1836
Aletia sicula Treitschke, 1835
Aletia straminea Treitschke, 1825
Aletia vitellina (Hübner, [1808])
Allophyes asiatica Staudinger, 1892
Allophyes benedictina Staudinger, 1892
Allophyes metaxys Boursin, 1953
Allophyes oxyacanthae (Linnaeus, 1758)
Allophyes renalis Wiltshire, 1941
Alpichola egorovi Bang-Haas, 1934
Alpichola janhillmanni Hacker & Moberg, 1989
Alpichola lactiflora Draudt, 1934
Amephana dalmatica Rebel, 1919
Ammoconia caecimacula (Fabricius, 1787)
Ammoconia senex Geyer, [1828]
Amphidrina agrotina Staudinger, 1892
Amphipoea oculea (Linnaeus, 1761)
Amphipyra berbera Rungs, 1949
Amphipyra livida ([Denis & Schiffermüller], 1775)
Amphipyra micans Lederer, 1857
Amphipyra molybdea Christoph, 1867
Amphipyra perflua (Fabricius, 1787)
Amphipyra pyramidea (Linnaeus, 1758)
Amphipyra stix Herrich-Schäffer, [1850]
Amphipyra tetra (Fabricius, 1787)
Amphipyra tragopoginis Clerck, 1759
Amphipyra turcomana Staudinger, 1888
Anaplectoides prasina Goeze, 1781
Anchoscelis deleta Staudinger, 1881
Anchoscelis gratiosa Staudinger, 1881
Anchoscelis helvola (Linnaeus, 1758)
Anchoscelis humilis (Fabricius, 1787)
Anchoscelis imitata Ronkay, 1984
Anchoscelis kindermannii F.R., 1838
Anchoscelis litura (Linnaeus, 1761)
Anchoscelis lota Clerck, 1759
Anchoscelis macilenta (Hübner, [1809])
Anchoscelis nitida (Fabricius, 1787)
Anchoscelis oropotamica Wiltshire, 1941
Anchoscelis osthelderi Boursin, 1951
Anchoscelis rupicapra Staudinger, 1879
Anchoscelis saitana Derra, 1990
Aneda rivularis (Fabricius, 1775)
Anepia esperi Hacker, 1992
Anepia irregularis (Hufnagel, 1766)
Anepia musculina Staudinger, 1892
Anepia neglecta Hacker, 1992
Anepia pumila Staudinger, 1879
Anepia wolfi Hacker, 1992
Anopoma riparia Rambur, 1829
Antarchaea conicephala Staudinger, 1870
Antarchaea numisma (Hübner, [1803])
Antennola impura Mann, 1862
Antholopha gloriosa Staudinger, 1892
Antholopha ionodoxa Ronkay, 1990
Anthracia eriopoda Herrich-Schäffer, [1851]
Antitype chi (Linnaeus, 1758)
Antitype chionodes Boursin, 1968
Antitype jonis Lederer, 1865
Anua bimaculata Osthelder, 1933
Anua lunaris Goeze, 1781
Anumeta arax Fibiger, 1995
Apamea anceps ([Denis & Schiffermüller], 1775)
Apamea aquila Donzel, 1837
Apamea crenata (Hufnagel, 1766)
Apamea epomidion Haworth, [1809]
Apamea euxinia Hacker, 1985
Apamea ferrago Eversmann, 1837
Apamea furva Goeze, 1781
Apamea illyria Freyer, 1846
Apamea indiges Turati, 1926
Apamea lateritia (Hufnagel, 1766)
Apamea leucodon Eversmann, 1837
Apamea lithoxylaea (Fabricius, 1787)
Apamea maraschi Draudt, 1934
Apamea monoglypha (Hufnagel, 1766)
Apamea oblonga Haworth, [1809]
Apamea platinea Treitschke, 1825
Apamea pyxina Bang-Haas, 1910
Apamea remissa (Hübner, [1809])
Apamea scolopacina (Esper, [1788])
Apamea sicula Treitschke, 1835
Apamea sordens (Hufnagel, 1766)
Apamea sublustris (Esper, [1788])
Apamea unanimis (Hübner, [1813])
Apamea zeta Treitschke, 1825
Apaustis rupicola ([Denis & Schiffermüller], 1775)
Apaustis theophila Staudinger, 1866
Apopestes noe Ronkay, 1990
Apopestes phantasma Eversmann, 1843
Apopestes spectrum (Esper, [1787])
Aporophyla australis Boisduval, 1829
Aporophyla canescens Duponchel, 1826
Aporophyla lutulenta ([Denis & Schiffermüller], 1775)
Aporophyla nigra Haworth, [1809]
Archanara algae (Esper, [1789])
Archanara geminipuncta Haworth, [1809]
Archanara sparganii (Esper, [1790])
Arcyophora dentula Lederer, 1870
Arenostola semicana (Esper, [1798])
Argyrospila succinea (Esper, [1798])
Armada panaceorum Ménétriés, 1849
Atethmia ambusta (Fabricius, 1787)
Atethmia centrago Haworth, [1809]
Atethmia obscura Osthelder, 1933
Atethmia pinkeri Hacker, [1987]
Athetis furvula (Hübner, [1808])
Athetis gluteosa Treitschke, 1835
Athetis hospes Freyer, 1831
Athetis pallustris (Hübner, [1808])
Atypha pulmonaris (Esper, [1790])
Auchmis detersa (Esper, [1791])
Autographa aemula ([Denis & Schiffermüller], 1775)
Autographa gamma (Linnaeus, 1758)
Autographa jota (Linnaeus, 1758)
Autographa messmeri Schadewald, 1993
Autophila asiatica Staudinger, 1888
Autophila banghaasi Boursin, 1940
Autophila cerealis Staudinger, 1871
Autophila depressa Püngeler, 1914
Autophila dilucida (Hübner, [1808])
Autophila einsleri Amsel, 1935
Autophila hirsuta Staudinger, 1870
Autophila iranica Ronkay, 1989
Autophila libanotica Staudinger, 1901
Autophila limbata Staudinger, 1871
Autophila sinesafida Wiltshire, 1952
Axylia putris (Linnaeus, 1761)
Behounekia freyeri Frivaldsky, 1835
Bena prasinana (Linnaeus, 1758)
Brachionycha sphinx (Hufnagel, 1766)
Brachionycha syriaca Warren, 1910
Brachylomia uralensis Warren, 1910
Brachylomia viminalis (Fabricius, 1777)
Brandticola dubiosa Brandt, 1938
Bryoleuca dolopsis Hampson, 1908
Bryoleuca labecula Lederer, 1855
Bryoleuca microphysa Boursin, 1952
Bryoleuca petrea Guenée, 1852
Bryoleuca petricolor Lederer, 1870
Bryoleuca raddei Boursin, 1963
Bryoleuca raptricula ([Denis & Schiffermüller], 1775)
Bryoleuca rectilinea Warren, 1909
Bryoleuca remanei Heydemann & Schulte, 1963
Bryoleuca seladona Christoph, 1885
Bryoleuca tephrocharis Boursin, 1953
Bryomima carducha Staudinger, 1900
Bryomima defreina Hacker, 1986
Bryomima hakkariensis Freina, & Hacker, 1985
Bryomima luteosordida Osthelder, 1933
Bryophila eucharista Boursin, 1960
Bryophila maeonis Lederer, 1865
Bryophila occidentalis Osthelder, 1933
Bryophilopsis roederi Standfuss, 1892
Bryopsis amasina Draudt, 1931
Bryopsis muralis Forster, 1771
Caeshadena caesia ([Denis & Schiffermüller], 1775)
Calamia staudingeri Warnecke, 1941
Calliergis ramosa (Esper, [1786])
Callistege mi Clerck, 1759
Callopistria juventina Stoll, [1782]
Calocucullia celsiae Herrich-Schäffer, [1850]
Calophasia acuta Freyer, [1838]
Calophasia barthae Wagner, 1929
Calophasia lunula (Hufnagel, 1766)
Calophasia opalina (Esper, [1796])
Calophasia platyptera (Esper, [1788])
Calymma communimacula ([Denis & Schiffermüller], 1775)
Calymnia trapezina (Linnaeus, 1758)
Calyptra thalictri Borkhausen, 1790
Caradrina morpheus (Hufnagel, 1766)
Cardepia arenbergeri Pinker, 1974
Cardepia hartigi Parenzan, 1981
Cardepia sociabilis Graslin, 1850
Catephia alchymista ([Denis & Schiffermüller], 1775)
Catocala abacta Staudinger, 1900
Catocala conjuncta (Esper, [1787])
Catocala conversa (Esper, [1787])
Catocala dilecta (Hübner, [1808])
Catocala elocata (Esper, [1787])
Catocala fraxini (Linnaeus, 1758)
Catocala hymenaea Goeze, 1781
Catocala lesbia Christoph, 1887
Catocala lupina Herrich-Schäffer, [1851]
Catocala mesopotamica Kuznesov, 1903
Catocala neonympha (Esper, [1796])
Catocala nupta (Linnaeus, 1767)
Catocala nymphagoga (Esper, [1787])
Catocala promissa Goeze, 1781
Catocala puerpera Giorna, 1791
Catocala sponsa (Linnaeus, 1767)
Ceramica pisi (Linnaeus, 1758)
Cerapteryx graminis (Linnaeus, 1758)
Cerapteryx megala Alpheraky, 1882
Cerastis rubricosa (Fabricius, 1787)
Cerocala sana Staudinger, 1901
Charanyca trigrammica (Hufnagel, 1766)
Chazaria incarnata Freyer, 1838
Cheirophanes anaphanes Boursin, 1940
Cheirophanes ligaminosa Eversmann, 1851
Cheirophanes plattneri Boursin, 1955
Chersotis adili Koçak, 1987
Chersotis alpestris Boisduval, 1834
Chersotis anachoreta Herrich-Schäffer, [1851]
Chersotis anatolica Draudt, 1936
Chersotis andereggii Boisduval, 1832
Chersotis capnistis Lederer, 1872
Chersotis cuprea ([Denis & Schiffermüller], 1775)
Chersotis ebertorum Koçak, 1980
Chersotis elegans Eversmann, 1837
Chersotis fimbriola (Esper, [1798])
Chersotis firdussi Schwingenschuss, 1937
Chersotis friedeli Pinker, 1974
Chersotis glebosa Staudinger, 1900
Chersotis gratissima Corti, 1932
Chersotis illauta Draudt, 1936
Chersotis juvenis Staudinger, 1901
Chersotis laeta Rebel, 1904
Chersotis larixia Guenée, 1852
Chersotis luperinoides Guenée, 1852
Chersotis margaritacea Villers, 1789
Chersotis multangula (Hübner, [1803])
Chersotis rectangula (Fabricius, 1787)
Chersotis ronkayorum Fibiger, Hacker & Varga, 1992
Chersotis sarhada Brandt, 1941
Chersotis semna Püngeler, 1906
Chersotis stenographa Varga, 1979
Chersotis zukowskyi Draudt, 1936
Chilodes maritimus Tauscher, 1806
Chionoxantha staudingeri Standfuss, 1892
Chrysodeixis chalcites (Esper, [1789])
Cirrhia gilvago ([Denis & Schiffermüller], 1775)
Cirrhia icteritia (Hufnagel, 1766)
Cirrhia ocellaris Borkhausen, 1792
Cleoceris scoriacea (Esper, [1789])
Cleonymia baetica Rambur, [1837]
Cleonymia opposita Lederer, 1870
Clytie distincta Bang-Haas, 1907
Clytie syriaca Bugnion, 1837
Clytie terrulenta Christoph, 1893
Coccidiphaga scitula Rambur, 1833
Colobochyla platyzona Lederer, 1870
Colobochyla salicalis ([Denis & Schiffermüller], 1775)
Colocasia coryli (Linnaeus, 1758)
Colonsideridis albicolon (Hübner, [1809])
Conisania capsivora Draudt, 1933
Conistra acutula Staudinger, 1892
Conistra asiatica Pinker, 1980
Conistra erythrocephala (Fabricius, 1787)
Conistra kasyi Boursin, 1963
Conistra ligula (Esper, [1791])
Conistra metria Boursin, 1940
Conistra rubiginea (Fabricius, 1787)
Conistra torrida Lederer, 1857
Conistra vaccinii (Linnaeus, 1761)
Conistra veronicae (Hübner, [1813])
Copiphana oliva Staudinger, 1895
Copiphana olivina Herrich-Schäffer, [1852]
Cornutiplusia circumflexa (Linnaeus, 1767)
Cosmia affinis (Linnaeus, 1767)
Cosmia confinis Herrich-Schäffer, [1849]
Cosmia diffinis (Linnaeus, 1767)
Craniophora ligustri (Fabricius, 1787)
Craniophora pontica Staudinger, 1879
Crassagrotis crassa (Hübner, [1803])
Crassagrotis obesa Boisduval, 1829
Cryphia receptricula (Hübner, [1803])
Cucullia absinthii (Linnaeus, 1761)
Cucullia anifurca Goeze, 1781
Cucullia argentina (Fabricius, 1787)
Cucullia artemisiae ([Denis & Schiffermüller], 1775)
Cucullia behouneki Hacker & Ronkay, 1988
Cucullia boryphora Fischer de Waldheim, 1840
Cucullia calendulae Treitschke, 1835
Cucullia chamomillae ([Denis & Schiffermüller], 1775)
Cucullia citella Ronkay & Ronkay, 1987
Cucullia dracunculi (Hübner, [1813])
Cucullia gnaphalii (Hübner, [1813])
Cucullia lucifuga (Hübner, [1803])
Cucullia mixta Freyer, 1842
Cucullia santolinae Rambur, 1834
Cucullia santonici (Hübner, [1813])
Cucullia syrtana Mabille, 1888
Cucullia tanaceti Goeze, 1781
Cucullia tecca Püngeler, 1906
Cucullia umbratica (Linnaeus, 1758)
Cucullia xeranthemi Boisduval, 1840
Dasymixis diva Ronkay & Varga, 1990
Dasypolia altissima Hacker & Moberg, 1988
Dasypolia dichroa Ronkay & Varga, 1985
Dasypolia ferdinandi Rühl, 1892
Dasypolia fibigeri Hacker & Moberg, 1988
Dasypolia templi Thunberg, 1792
Desertoplusia bella Christoph, 1887
Desertoplusia colornata Varga & Ronkay, 1991
Diachrysia chrysitis (Linnaeus, 1758)
Diachrysia chryson (Esper, [1789])
Diachrysia tutti Kostrowicki, 1961
Diachrysia Hübner, [1821]
Dianthivora implexa (Hübner, [1809])
Diarsia brunnea Goeze, 1781
Diarsia florida Schmidt, 1859
Diarsia mendica (Fabricius, 1775)
Diarsia rubi Vieweg, 1790
Dichagyris achtalensis Kozhantshikov, 1929
Dichagyris amoena Staudinger, 1892
Dichagyris anastasia Draudt, 1936
Dichagyris cataleipa Varga, 1993
Dichagyris celebrata Alpheraky, 1897
Dichagyris elbursica Draudt, 1937
Dichagyris eremicola Standfuss, 1888
Dichagyris erubescens Staudinger, 1892
Dichagyris eureteocles Boursin, 1940
Dichagyris forficula Eversmann, 1851
Dichagyris fredi Brandt, 1938
Dichagyris griseotincta Wagner, 1931
Dichagyris grisescens Staudinger, 1879
Dichagyris leucomelas Brandt, 1941
Dichagyris melanura Kollar, 1846
Dichagyris pfeifferi Corti & Draudt, 1933
Dichagyris psammochroa Boursin, 1940
Dichagyris renigera (Hübner, [1808])
Dichagyris singularis Staudinger, 1877
Dichagyris squalidior Staudinger, 1901
Dichagyris squalorum Eversmann, 1856
Dichagyris terminicincta Corti, 1933
Dichagyris vallesiaca Boisduval, 1832
Dichagyris wolfi Hacker, 1985
Dichonia aeruginea (Hübner, [1803])
Dichonia convergens ([Denis & Schiffermüller], 1775)
Dichonioxa tenebrosa (Esper, [1789])
Dichromia munitalis Mann, 1861
Dicycla oo (Linnaeus, 1758)
Diloba caeruleocephala (Linnaeus, 1758)
Discestra baksana Schintlmeister, 1986
Discestra dianthi Tauscher, 1809
Discestra furca Eversmann, 1852
Discestra latemarginata Wiltshire, 1976
Discestra loeffleri Reisser, 1958
Discestra mendax Staudinger, 1879
Discestra mendica Staudinger, 1895
Discestra stigmosa Christoph, 1887
Discestra trifolii (Hufnagel, 1766)
Divaena haywardi Tams, 1926
Drasteria cailino Lefebvre, 1827
Drasteria caucasica Kolenati, 1846
Drasteria flexuosa Ménétriés, 1847
Drasteria herzi Alpheraky, 1895
Drasteria picta Christoph, 1877
Drasteria rada Boisduval, 1848
Drasteria saisani Staudinger, 1882
Drasteria sequax Staudinger, 1901
Drasteria sesquilina Staudinger, 1888
Dryobota labecula (Esper, [1788])
Dryobotodes eremita (Fabricius, 1775)
Dryobotodes servadeii Parenzan, 1982
Dypterygia scabriuscula (Linnaeus, 1758)
Dysgonia algira (Linnaeus, 1767)
Dysgonia torrida Guenée, 1852
Earias chlorophyllana Staudinger, 1892
Earias clorana (Linnaeus, 1761)
Earias insulana Boisduval, 1833
Earias syriacana Bartel, 1903
Earias vernana (Fabricius, 1787)
Ecbolemia misella Püngeler, 1907
Egira anatolica Hering, 1933
Egira conspicillaris (Linnaeus, 1758)
Egira fatima Hreblay, 1994
Egira tibori Hreblay, 1994
Eicomorpha antiqua Staudinger, 1888
Eicomorpha kurdestanica Freina, & Hacker, 1985
Elaphria venustula (Hübner, 1790)
Emmelia trabealis Scopoli, 1763
Enargia paleacea (Esper, [1788])
Enargia pinkeri Freina, & Hacker, 1985
Ephesia disjuncta Geyer, [1828]
Ephesia diversa Geyer, [1828]
Ephesia eutychea Treitschke, 1835
Ephesia fulminea Scopoli, 1763
Ephesia nymphaea (Esper, [1787])
Epilecta linogrisea ([Denis & Schiffermüller], 1775)
Epipsilia latens (Hübner, [1809])
Episema amasina Hampson, 1906
Episema didymogramma Boursin, 1955
Episema glaucina (Esper, [1789])
Episema korsakovi Christoph, 1885
Episema lederi Christoph, 1885
Episema tersa ([Denis & Schiffermüller], 1775)
Eremobia ochroleuca ([Denis & Schiffermüller], 1775)
Eremodrina agenjoi Boursin, 1936
Eremodrina avis Pinker, 1980
Eremodrina belucha Swinhoe, 1885
Eremodrina bodenheimeri Draudt, 1934
Eremodrina draudti Boursin, 1936
Eremodrina gilva Donzel, 1837
Eremodrina inumbrata Staudinger, 1900
Eremodrina inumbratella Pinker, 1980
Eremodrina pertinax Staudinger, 1879
Eremodrina salzi Boursin, 1936
Eremodrina vicina Staudinger, 1870
Eremodrina zernyi Boursin, 1936
Eremophysa apotheina Brandt, 1938
Eremophysa discordans Boursin, 1940
Eriopygodes imbecilla (Fabricius, 1794)
Eublemma albivestalis Hampson, 1910
Eublemma caelestis Brandt, 1938
Eublemma candidana (Fabricius, 1794)
Eublemma chlorotica Lederer, 1858
Eublemma cochylioides Guenée, 1852
Eublemma gratissima Staudinger, 1892
Eublemma hansa Herrich-Schäffer, [1851]
Eublemma minutata (Fabricius, 1794)
Eublemma ochreola Staudinger, 1900
Eublemma ostrina (Hübner, [1808])
Eublemma pallidula Herrich-Schäffer, 1856
Eublemma panonica Freyer, 1840
Eublemma parallela Freyer, 1842
Eublemma parva (Hübner, [1808])
Eublemma polygramma Duponchel, 1836
Eublemma purpurina ([Denis & Schiffermüller], 1775)
Eublemma pusilla Eversmann, 1837
Eublemma ragusana Freyer, 1844
Eublemma respersa (Hübner, 1790)
Eublemma rosina (Hübner, [1803])
Eublemma siticulosa Lederer, 1858
Eublemma straminea Staudinger, 1892
Eublemma substrigula Staudinger, 1892
Eublemma suppuncta Staudinger, 1892
Eublemma suppura Staudinger, 1892
Eublemma transmittens Christoph, 1893
Eublemma viridula Guenée, 1841
Eublemma wagneri Herrich-Schäffer, 1851
Euchalcia annemaria Freina, & Hacker, 1985
Euchalcia armeniae Dufay, 1966
Euchalcia augusta Staudinger, 1892
Euchalcia biezanskoi Alberti, 1965
Euchalcia cuprescens Dufay, 1966
Euchalcia dorsiflava Standfuss, 1892
Euchalcia emichi Rogenhofer, 1873
Euchalcia hedeja Dufay, 1978
Euchalcia kautti Hacker, 1992
Euchalcia kitchingi Hacker & Ronkay, 1992
Euchalcia maria Staudinger, 1892
Euchalcia paulina Staudinger, 1892
Euchalcia siderifera Eversmann, 1846
Euchalcia taurica Osthelder, 1933
Euchalcia variabilis Piller & Mitterbacher, 1783
Euchalcia viridis Staudinger, 1901
Euclidia glyphica (Linnaeus, 1758)
Eugnorisma chaldaica Boisduval, 1840
Eugnorisma eminens Lederer, 1855
Eugnorisma enargialis Draudt, 1936
Eugnorisma insignata Lederer, 1853
Eugnorisma kurdistana Hacker et al., 1986
Eugnorisma leuconeura Hampson, 1918
Eugnorisma semiramis Boursin, 1940
Euplexia lucipara (Linnaeus, 1758)
Eupsilia transversa (Hufnagel, 1766)
Eurois occulta (Linnaeus, 1758)
Euschesis interjecta (Hübner, [1803])
Euschesis janthina ([Denis & Schiffermüller], 1775)
Euschesis tertia Mentzer Moberg & Fibiger, 1991
Eutelia adoratrix Staudinger, 1892
Eutelia adulatrix (Hübner, [1813])
Euthales algae (Fabricius, 1775)
Euthales ochsi Boursin, 1941
Euxoa adjemi Brandt, 1941
Euxoa agricola Boisduval, 1829
Euxoa anaemica Draudt, 1936
Euxoa anatolica Draudt, 1936
Euxoa aquilina ([Denis & Schiffermüller], 1775)
Euxoa basigramma Staudinger, 1870
Euxoa birivia ([Denis & Schiffermüller], 1775)
Euxoa christophi Staudinger, 1870
Euxoa conifera Christoph, 1877
Euxoa cos (Hübner, [1824])
Euxoa deserta Staudinger, 1870
Euxoa difficillima Draudt, 1937
Euxoa distinguenda Lederer, 1857
Euxoa emolliens Warren, 1909
Euxoa enitens Corti, 1926
Euxoa friedeli Pinker, 1980
Euxoa glabella Wagner, 1930
Euxoa hastifera Donzel, 1847
Euxoa heringi Christoph, 1877
Euxoa hilaris Freyer, 1838
Euxoa homicida Staudinger, 1900
Euxoa inclusa Corti, 1931
Euxoa lidia Cramer, [1782]
Euxoa luteomixta Wagner, 1932
Euxoa mobergi Fibiger, 1990
Euxoa mustelina Christoph, 1877
Euxoa nigricans (Linnaeus, 1761)
Euxoa obelisca ([Denis & Schiffermüller], 1775)
Euxoa ochrogaster Guenée, 1852
Euxoa perierga Brandt, 1938
Euxoa recussa (Hübner, [1817])
Euxoa robiginosa Staudinger, 1895
Euxoa rubrior Pinker, 1980
Euxoa scurrilis Draudt, 1937
Euxoa segnilis Duponchel, 1836
Euxoa subdecora Hampson, 1903
Euxoa sulcifera Christoph, 1893
Euxoa temera (Hübner, [1808])
Euxoa tritici (Linnaeus, 1758)
Euxoa vanensis Draudt, 1937
Euxoa vitta (Esper, [1789])
Euxoa waltharii Corti, 1931
Euxoa zernyi Boursin, 1944
Evisa schawerdae Reisser, 1930
Exophila rectangularis (Hübner, [1828])
Frivaldskyola mansueta Herrich-Schäffer, [1850]
Gonospileia munita (Hübner, [1813])
Gonospileia triquetra ([Denis & Schiffermüller], 1775)
Gortyna cervago Eversmann, 1844
Gortyna flavago (Esper, [1791])
Gortyna hethitica Hacker et al., 1986
Gortyna moesiaca Herrich-Schäffer, [1849]
Gortyna osmana Hacker et al., 1986
Grammodes bifasciata Petagna, 1788
Griposia aprilina (Linnaeus, 1758)
Griposia pinkeri Kobes, 1973
Grisyigoga candelisequa ([Denis & Schiffermüller], 1775)
Guselderia mitis Püngeler, 1906
Hada nana (Hufnagel, 1766)
Hada persa Alpheraky, 1897
Hadena armeriae Guenée, 1852
Hadena bicruris (Hufnagel, 1766)
Hadena canescens Brandt, 1947
Hadena cavalla Pinker, 1980
Hadena defreinai Hacker et al., 1986
Hadena drenowskii Rebel, 1930
Hadena gueneei Staudinger, 1901
Hadena literata Fischer de Waldheim, 1840
Hadena luteocincta Rambur, 1834
Hadena melanochroa Staudinger, 1892
Hadena pfeifferi Draudt, 1934
Hadena pseudodealbata Freina, & Hacker, 1985
Hadena pseudohyrcana Freina, & Hacker, 1985
Hadena staudingeri Wagner, 1931
Hadena stenoptera Rebel, 1933
Hadena vulcanica Turati, 1907
Hadjina lutosa Staudinger, 1892
Haemerosia renalis (Hübner, [1813])
Haemerosia vassilininei Bang-Haas, 1912
Hakkaria varga Hacker, [1987]
Hecatera bicolorata (Hufnagel, 1766)
Hecatera cappa (Hübner, [1809])
Hecatera rhodocharis Brandt, 1938
Hecatera spinaciae Vieweg, 1790
Helicoverpa armigera (Hübner, [1808])
Heliophobus reticulata Goeze, 1781
Heliophobus texturata Alpheraky, 1892
Heliothis maritima Graslin, 1855
Heliothis nubigera Herrich-Schäffer, [1851]
Heliothis ononis (Fabricius, 1787)
Heliothis peltigera ([Denis & Schiffermüller], 1775)
Heliothis viriplaca (Hufnagel, 1766)
Herminia grisealis ([Denis & Schiffermüller], 1775)
Herminia nigricaria Osthelder, 1933
Herminia proxima Christoph, 1893
Herminia tarsicrinalis Knoch, 1782
Herminia tarsipennalis Treitschke, 1835
Herminia tenuialis Rebel, 1899
Heteropalpia vetusta Walker, 1865
Heterophysa dumetorum Geyer, [1834]
Himalistra tahiricola Ronkay & Hreblay, 1994
Hoplodrina ambigua ([Denis & Schiffermüller], 1775)
Hoplodrina blanda ([Denis & Schiffermüller], 1775)
Hoplodrina levis Staudinger, 1888
Hoplodrina octogenaria Goeze, 1781
Hoplodrina pfeifferi Boursin, 1932
Hoplodrina respersa ([Denis & Schiffermüller], 1775)
Hoplodrina superstes Ochsenheimer, 1816
Hoplotarache sordescens Staudinger, 1895
Hypena amica Butler, 1878
Hypena obesalis Treitschke, 1829
Hypena obsitalis (Hübner, [1813])
Hypena palpalis (Hübner, 1796)
Hypena proboscidalis (Linnaeus, 1758)
Hypena rostralis (Linnaeus, 1758)
Hypenodes anatolica Schwingenschuss, 1938
Hypenodes kalchbergi Staudinger, 1876
Hypenodes orientalis Staudinger, 1901
Hypeuthina fulgurita Lederer, 1855
Hyppa rectilinea (Esper, [1788])
Hyssia cavernosa Eversmann, 1852
Idia calvaria ([Denis & Schiffermüller], 1775)
Ipimorpha retusa (Linnaeus, 1761)
Ipimorpha subtusa (Fabricius, 1787)
Iranada tarachoides Bytinski-Salz & Brandt, 1937
Janthinea divalis Staudinger, 1892
Janthinea frivaldszkii Duponchel, 1835
Jodia croceago (Fabricius, 1787)
Lacanobia blenna (Hübner, [1824])
Lacanobia dissimilis Knoch, 1781
Lacanobia histrio Goeze, 1781
Lacanobia oleracea (Linnaeus, 1758)
Lacanobia praedita (Hübner, [1813])
Lacanobia thalassina (Hufnagel, 1766)
Lacanobia w-latinum (Hufnagel, 1766)
Lampra fimbriata Schreber, 1759
Lampra tirennica Biebinger, 1983
Lamprosticta culta Goeze, 1781
Lasionycta draudti Wagner, 1936
Lasionycta proxima (Hübner, [1809])
Laspeyria flexula ([Denis & Schiffermüller], 1775)
Latanoctua orbona (Hufnagel, 1766)
Ledereragrotis multifida Lederer, 1870
Leucania comma (Linnaeus, 1761)
Leucania herrichi Herrich-Schäffer, [1849]
Leucania obsoleta (Hübner, [1803])
Leucania palaestinae Staudinger, 1897
Leucania punctosa Treitschke, 1825
Leucania putrescens (Hübner, [1824])
Leucania zeae Duponchel, 1827
Leucochlaena hirsutus Staudinger, 1892
Leucochlaena hoerhammeri Wagner, 1931
Leucochlaena jordana Draudt, 1934
Leucochlaena muscosa Staudinger, 1892
Leucochlaena rosinae Bohatsch, 1908
Lithophane hepatica Clerck, 1759
Lithophane lapidea (Hübner, [1808])
Lithophane ledereri Staudinger, 1892
Lithophane merckii Rambur, 1832
Lithophane ornitopus (Hufnagel, 1766)
Lithophane semibrunnea Haworth, [1809]
Lophoterges hoerhammeri Wagner, 1931
Luperina diversa Staudinger, 1892
Luperina dumerilii Duponchel, 1826
Luperina koshantschikovi Püngeler, 1914
Luperina rjabovi Kljutschko, 1967
Luperina rubella Duponchel, 1835
Luperina testacea ([Denis & Schiffermüller], 1775)
Luteohadena luteago ([Denis & Schiffermüller], 1775)
Lygephila craccae (Fabricius, 1787)
Lygephila ludicra (Hübner, 1790)
Lygephila lusoria (Linnaeus, 1758)
Lygephila pallida Bang-Haas, 1907
Lygephila pastinum Treitschke, 1826
Lygephila procax (Hübner, [1813])
Lygephila schachti Behounek & Hacker, 1986
Lygephila viciae (Hübner, [1822])
Macdunnoughia confusa Stephens, 1850
Maghadena magnolii Boisduval, 1828
Mamestra brassicae (Linnaeus, 1758)
Maraschia grisescens Osthelder, 1933
Margelana flavidior Wagner, 1931
Margelana versicolor Staudinger, 1888
Megalodes eximia Freyer, 1845
Meganephria bimaculosa (Linnaeus, 1767)
Meganola albula (Hübner, 1793)
Meganola asperalis Villers, 1789
Meganola togatulalis (Hübner, 1796)
Melanchra persicariae (Linnaeus, 1761)
Mesapamea didyma (Esper, [1788])
Mesapamea secalis (Linnaeus, 1758)
Mesogona acetosellae Goeze, 1781
Mesogona oxalina (Hübner, [1803])
Mesoligia furuncula ([Denis & Schiffermüller], 1775)
Mesoligia literosa Haworth, [1809]
Metachrostis dardouini Boisduval, 1840
Metachrostis sefidi Brandt, 1938
Metachrostis velocior Staudinger, 1892
Metachrostis velox (Hübner, [1813])
Metaegle diatemna Boursin, 1962
Metaegle exquisita Boursin, 1969
Metaegle gratiosa Staudinger, 1892
Metaegle kaekeritziana (Hübner, [1799])
Metaegle nubila Staudinger, 1892
Metaegle ottoi Schawerda, 1923
Metaegle pallida Staudinger, 1892
Metaegle vespertalis (Hübner, [1813])
Metagnorisma depuncta (Linnaeus, 1761)
Metagnorisma heuristica Varga & Ronkay, 1987
Metagnorisma pontica Staudinger, 1892
Metagnorisma rafidain Boursin, 1936
Metalopha liturata Christoph, 1887
Methorasa latreillei Duponchel, 1827
Metopoceras beata Staudinger, 1892
Metopoceras delicata Staudinger, 1898
Metopoceras omar Oberthür, 1887
Metopodicha ernesti Draudt, 1936
Metoponrhis albirena Christoph, 1887
Metopoplus boursini Brandt, 1938
Metopoplus excelsa Christoph, 1885
Micriantha decorata Frivaldsky, 1845
Miselia albimacula Borkhausen, 1792
Miselia clara Staudinger, 1901
Miselia compta ([Denis & Schiffermüller], 1775)
Miselia confusa (Hufnagel, 1766)
Miselia filograna (Esper, [1788])
Mniotype adusta (Esper, [1790])
Mniotype crinomima Wiltshire, 1946
Mniotype rjabovi Boursin, 1944
Moma alpium Osbeck, 1778
Monobotodes monochroma (Esper, [1790])
Mormo maura (Linnaeus, 1758)
Mythimna noacki Boursin, 1967
Myxinia atossa Wiltshire, 1941
Myxinia chrysographa Wagner, 1931
Myxinia perchrysa Hacker & Ronkay, 1992
Myxinia philippsi Püngeler, 1911
Myxinia rufocincta Geyer, [1828]
Naenia typica (Linnaeus, 1758)
Netrocerocora quadrangula Eversmann, 1844
Nezonycta obtusa Varga & Ronkay, 1991
Nezonycta pusilla Püngeler, 1900
Noctua pronuba (Linnaeus, 1758)
Nodaria nodosalis Herrich-Schäffer, [1851]
Nola carelica Tengström, 1869
Nola chlamytulalis (Hübner, [1813])
Nola cicatricalis Treitschke, 1835
Nola cucullatella (Linnaeus, 1758)
Nola gigantula Staudinger, 1879
Nola harouni Wiltshire, 1951
Nola subchlamydula Staudinger, 1870
Nola taurica Daniel, 1935
Nonargia typhae Thunberg, 1784
Nycteola asiatica Krulikovsky, 1904
Nycteola columbana Turner, 1925
Nycteola eremostola Dufay, 1961
Nycteola revayana Scopoli, 1772
Nycteola siculana Fuchs, 1899
Ochropleura leucogaster Freyer, 1831
Ochropleura plecta (Linnaeus, 1761)
Odice arcuinna (Hübner, 1790)
Odice kuelekana Staudinger, 1871
Odice suava (Hübner, [1813])
Oligia latruncula ([Denis & Schiffermüller], 1775)
Oligia strigilis (Linnaeus, 1758)
Omphalophana anatolica Lederer, 1857
Omphalophana antirrhinii (Hübner, [1803])
Omphalophana durnalayana Osthelder, 1933
Omphalophana pauli Staudinger, 1892
Oncocnemis arenbergeri Hacker & Lödl, 1989
Oncocnemis confusa Freyer, 1842
Oncocnemis fuscopicta Wiltshire, 1976
Oncocnemis iranica Schwingenschuss, 1937
Oncocnemis nigricula Eversmann, 1847
Oncocnemis strioligera Lederer, 1853
Ophiuche lividalis (Hübner, 1790)
Ophiusa tirhaca Cramer, [1777]
Opigena polygona (Fabricius, 1787)
Orectis proboscidalis Herrich-Schäffer, [1851]
Oria musculosa (Hübner, [1808])
Orrhodiella chaijami Hacker & Weigert, 1986
Orrhodiella ragusae Failla-Tedaldi, 1890
Orthosia cerasi (Fabricius, 1775)
Orthosia dalmatica Wagner, 1909
Orthosia gothica (Linnaeus, 1758)
Orthosia gracilis (Fabricius, 1787)
Orthosia incerta (Hufnagel, 1766)
Orthosia populeti (Fabricius, 1781)
Orthosia pulverulenta (Esper, [1786])
Orthosia rorida Frivaldsky, 1835
Orthosia rubricosa (Esper, [1786])
Orthosia schmidtii Dioszeghy, 1935
Orthosia wolfi Hacker, 1988
Ostheldera arne Ronkay & Varga, 1994
Ostheldera gracilis Osthelder, 1933
Oxytrypia orbiculosa (Esper, [1799])
Oxytrypia stephania Sutton, [1964]
Ozarba lascivalis Lederer, 1855
Ozarba moldavicola Herrich-Schäffer, [1851]
Pachetra sagittigera (Hufnagel, 1766)
Pachyagrotis ankarensis Rebel, 1931
Pachyagrotis benigna Corti, 1926
Pachyagrotis tischendorfi Püngeler, 1915
Pachyagrotis wichgrafi Corti & Draudt, 1933
Palaeographa interrogationis (Linnaeus, 1758)
Panchrysia deaurata (Esper, [1787])
Panolis flammea ([Denis & Schiffermüller], 1775)
Panthea coenobita (Esper, [1785])
Papestra biren Goeze, 1781
Paracolax tristalis (Fabricius, 1794)
Paradrina atriluna Guenée, 1852
Paradrina boursini Wagner, 1936
Paradrina cilicia Hacker, 1992
Paradrina clavipalpis Scopoli, 1763
Paradrina flavirena Guenée, 1852
Paradrina muricolor Boursin, 1933
Paradrina poecila Boursin, 1939
Paradrina scotoptera Püngeler, 1914
Paradrina selini Boisduval, 1840
Paradrina wullschlegeli Püngeler, 1902
Paraegle ochracea Erschoff, 1874
Paraegle subochracea Staudinger, 1892
Paranoctua comes (Hübner, [1813])
Paranoctua interposita (Hübner, 1790)
Paranoctua warreni Lödl, 1987
Paraperplexia silenes (Hübner, [1822])
Parascotia detersa Staudinger, 1892
Parascotia fuliginaria (Linnaeus, 1761)
Parascotia robiginosa Staudinger, 1892
Parastichtis corticea (Esper, [1800])
Parastichtis suspecta (Hübner, [1817])
Pardoxia graellsi Feisthamel, 1837
Parexarnis ala Staudinger, 1881
Parexarnis damnata Draudt, 1937
Parexarnis figulina Draudt, 1936
Parexarnis pseudosollers Boursin, 1940
Parexarnis taurica Staudinger, 1879
Pericyma albidentaria Freyer, 1842
Pericyma squalens Lederer, 1855
Peridroma saucia (Hübner, [1808])
Perigrapha cilissa Püngeler, 1917
Perigrapha i-cinctum ([Denis & Schiffermüller], 1775)
Periphanes delphinii (Linnaeus, 1758)
Periphanes treitschkii Frivaldsky, 1835
Periphanes victorina Sodoffsky, 1849
Perplexhadena perplexa ([Denis & Schiffermüller], 1775)
Perplexhadena syriaca Osthelder, 1933
Phleboeis sureyae Rebel, 1931
Phlogophora meticulosa (Linnaeus, 1758)
Phlogophora scita (Hübner, 1790)
Photedes apameaoides Hacker 1989 
Photedes captiuncula Treitschke, 1825
Photedes fluxa (Hübner, [1809])
Phyllophila melacheila Staudinger, 1896
Phyllophila obliterata Rambur, 1833
Phytometra viridaria Clerck, 1759
Pinkericola cappadocia Hacker, 1987
Pinkericola inexpectata Varga, 1979
Pinkericola pygmaea Boursin, 1962
Pinkericola tephroleuca Boisduval, 1833
Platyperigea albina Eversmann, 1848
Platyperigea aspera Rambur, 1834
Platyperigea cinerascens Tengström, 1870
Platyperigea kadenii Freyer, 1836
Platyperigea rjabovi Boursin, 1936
Platyperigea syriaca Staudinger, 1892
Platyperigea terrea Freyer, [1840]
Platysenta viscosa Freyer, 1831
Plecoptera amanica Osthelder, 1933
Plecoptera inquinata Lederer, 1857
Plusia festucae (Linnaeus, 1758)
Plusidia cheiranthi Tauscher, 1809
Polia bombycina (Hufnagel, 1766)
Polia nebulosa (Hufnagel, 1766)
Polia serratilinea Ochsenheimer, 1816
Polia tincta Brahm, 1791
Polymixis bischoffi Herrich-Schäffer, [1850]
Polymixis manisadjiani Staudinger, 1881
Polymixis paradisiaca Boursin, 1944
Polymixis paravarga Ronkay et al., 1990
Polymixis polymita (Linnaeus, 1761)
Polyphaenis monophaenis Brandt, 1938
Polyphaenis propinqua Staudinger, 1895
Polyphaenis subsericata Herrich-Schäffer, 1861
Polyphaenis viridis Villers, 1789
Polypogon lunalis Scopoli, 1763
Polypogon plumigeralis (Hübner, [1825])
Polypogon strigilata (Linnaeus, 1758)
Polypogon tentacularia (Linnaeus, 1758)
Polypogon zelleralis Wocke, 1850
Powellinia lasserei Oberthür, 1881
Praestilbia armeniaca Staudinger, 1892
Prodotis stolida (Fabricius, 1775)
Propenistra laevis (Hübner, [1803])
Protexarnis confinis Staudinger, 1881
Protexarnis opisoleuca Staudinger, 1881
Protexarnis squalidiformis Corti & Draudt, 1933
Protodeltote pyrarga (Hufnagel, 1766)
Protoschinia scutosa Goeze, 1781
Protoschinia umbra (Hufnagel, 1766)
Pseudaletia unipuncta Haworth, [1809]
Pseudenargia deleta Osthelder, 1933
Pseudenargia regina Staudinger, 1892
Pseudeustrotia candidula ([Denis & Schiffermüller], 1775)
Pseudeustrotia deceptoria Scopoli, 1763
Pseudochropleura flammatra ([Denis & Schiffermüller], 1775)
Pseudochropleura musiva (Hübner, [1803])
Pseudohadena chenopodiphaga Rambur, 1832
Pseudohadena commoda Staudinger, 1889
Pseudohadena impedita Christoph, 1887
Pseudohadena laciniosa Christoph, 1887
Pseudoips fagana (Fabricius, 1781)
Pseudomniotype leuconota H.-Schäffer, [1850]
Pseudomniotype solieri Boisduval, 1840
Pseudozarba bipartita Herrich-Schäffer, [1850]
Putagrotis herzogi Rebel, 1911
Putagrotis puta (Hübner, [1803])
Putagrotis syricola Berio, 1936
Pyrocleptria cora Eversmann, 1837
Pyrois cinnamomea Goeze, 1781
Pyrois effusa Boisduval, 1829
Rasihia boursini Draudt, 1936
Rasihia duelduelica Osthelder, 1932
Rasihia hackeri Varga & Ronkay, 1991
Rasihia tabora Staudinger, 1892
Resapamea hedeni Graeser, 1888
Resapamea vaskeni Varga, 1979
Rhizedra lutosa (Hübner, [1803])
Rhyacia arenacea Hampson, 1907
Rhyacia helvetina Boisduval, 1833
Rhyacia lucipeta ([Denis & Schiffermüller], 1775)
Rhyacia nyctymerides Bang-Haas, 1922
Rhyacia simulans (Hufnagel, 1766)
Rhynchodontodes antiqualis (Hübner, [1809])
Rhynchodontodes mardinalis Staudinger, 1892
Rhynchodontodes ravalis Herrich-Schäffer, [1852]
Rhynchodontodes revolutalis Zeller, 1852
Rhypagla lacernaria (Hübner, [1813])
Rileyana fovea Treitschke, 1825
Rivula sericealis Scopoli, 1763
Rivula tanitalis Rebel, 1912
Roborbotodes carbonis Wagner, 1931
Rusina ferruginea (Esper, [1785])
Saragossa siccanorum Staudinger, 1870
Schinia cardui (Hübner, 1790)
Schinia cognata Freyer, [1833]
Schinia imperialis Staudinger, 1871
Schinia purpurascens Tauscher, 1809
Schrankia costaestrigalis Stephens, 1834
Schrankia taenialis (Hübner, [1809])
Scoliopteryx libatrix (Linnaeus, 1758)
Scotochrosta pulla Illiger, 1801
Serpmyxis serpentina Treitschke, 1825
Sesamia cretica Lederer, 1857
Sesamia lacteola Christoph, 1893
Sesamia nonagrioides Lefebvre, 1827
Shargacucullia anceps Staudinger, 1881
Shargacucullia armena Ronkay & Ronkay, 1986
Shargacucullia barthae Boursin, 1933
Shargacucullia blattariae (Esper, [1790])
Shargacucullia lychnitis Rambur, 1833
Shargacucullia osthelderi Boursin, 1933
Shargacucullia prenanthis Boisduval, 1840
Shargacucullia scrophulariae ([Denis & Schiffermüller], 1775)
Shargacucullia thapsiphaga Treitschke, 1826
Shargacucullia verbasci (Linnaeus, 1758)
Sideridis egena Lederer, 1853
Sideridis lampra Schawerda, 1913
Simplicia rectalis Eversmann, 1842
Simyra albovenosa Goeze, 1781
Simyra dentinosa Freyer, 1839
Simyra nervosa ([Denis & Schiffermüller], 1775)
Simyra renimaculata Osthelder, 1932
Spaelotis degeniata Christoph, 1877
Spaelotis demavendi Wagner, 1937
Spaelotis ravida ([Denis & Schiffermüller], 1775)
Spaelotis senna Freyer, 1829
Spodoptera abyssinia Guenée, 1852
Spodoptera exigua (Hübner, [1808])
Spodoptera littoralis Boisduval, 1833
Spudaea pontica Kljutshko, 1968
Standfussiana defessa Lederer, 1858
Standfussiana lucernea (Linnaeus, 1758)
Standfussiana nictymera Boisduval, 1934
Stenodrina aeschista Boursin, 1937
Stenoecia dos Freyer, [1838]
Stilbina hypaenides Staudinger, 1892
Subacronicta megacephala (Fabricius, 1787)
Sunira circellaris (Hufnagel, 1766)
Tarachephia hueberi Erschoff, 1874
Tathorhynchus excissata Lederer, 1855
Thalerastria diaphora Staudinger, 1879
Thalpophila matura (Hufnagel, 1766)
Tholera cespitis Goeze, 1781
Tholera decimalis (Poda, 1761)
Tholera hilaris Staudinger, 1901
Thria robusta Walker, [1858]
Thysanoplusia daubei Boisduval, 1840
Thysanoplusia orichalcea (Fabricius, 1775)
Tiliacea aurago ([Denis & Schiffermüller], 1775)
Tiliacea cypreago Hampson, 1906
Tiliacea fulvago Clerck, 1759
Trachea atriplicis (Linnaeus, 1758)
Trichoplusia circumscripta Freyer, 1831
Trichoplusia ni (Hübner, [1803])
Tristateles emortualis ([Denis & Schiffermüller], 1775)
Tyta luctuosa ([Denis & Schiffermüller], 1775)
Ulochlaena hirta (Hübner, [1813])
Valeria oleagina (Esper, [1786])
Valerietta boursini Freina, & Hacker, 1985
Valerietta niphopasta Hampson, 1906
Victrix artaxias Varga & Ronkay, 1989
Victrix gracilis Wagner, 1931
Victrix karsiana Staudinger, 1879
Victrix pinkeri Hacker & Lödl, 1989
Viminia auricoma (Fabricius, 1787)
Viminia euphorbiae Denis, 1785
Viminia orientalis Mann, 1862
Viminia rumicis (Linnaeus, 1758)
Xanthia togata (Esper, [1788])
Xanthodes albago (Fabricius, 1794)
Xanthothrix callicore Staudinger, 1871
Xenophysa huberi Varga, 1989
Xestia ashworthii Doubleday, 1855
Xestia baja Schrank, 1784
Xestia castanea (Esper, [1798])
Xestia c-nigrum (Linnaeus, 1758)
Xestia cohaesa Herrich-Schäffer, [1849]
Xestia ditrapezium (Fabricius, 1787)
Xestia miniago Freyer, 1840
Xestia ochreago (Hübner, [1809])
Xestia palaestinensis Kalchberg, 1897
Xestia pallidago Staudinger, 1900
Xestia rhomboidea (Esper, [1790])
Xestia sareptana Herrich-Schäffer, [1851]
Xestia triangulum (Hufnagel, 1766)
Xestia trifida Fischer v.Waldheim, 1820
Xestia xanthographa ([Denis & Schiffermüller], 1775)
Xylena exsoleta (Linnaeus, 1758)
Xylena lunifera Warren, 1910
Xylena vetusta (Hübner, [1813])
Xylocampa mustapha Oberthür, 1919
Yigoga amasicola Koçak, 1980
Yigoga celsicola Bellier, 1858
Yigoga flavina Herrich-Schäffer, [1852]
Yigoga forcipula ([Denis & Schiffermüller], 1775)
Yigoga gracilis Wagner, 1929
Yigoga hackeri Fibiger, 1992
Yigoga latipennis Püngeler, 1909
Yigoga libanicola Corti & Draudt, 1933
Yigoga nachadira Brandt, 1941
Yigoga nigrescens Höfner, 1888
Yigoga occidentalis Hacker, [1987]
Yigoga orientis Alpheraky, 1882
Yigoga romanovi Christoph, 1885
Yigoga serraticornis Staudinger, 1898
Yigoga signifera Schrank, 1782
Yigoga stigmatula Kozhantshikov, 1937
Yigoga truculenta Lederer, 1853
Yigoga weigerti Hacker & Varga, 1990
Yigoga wiltshirei Boursin, 1940
Zebeeba falsalis Herrich-Schäffer, [1851]
Zethes brandti Janson, 1977
Zethes insularis Rambur, 1833
Zethes narghisa Brandt, 1938
Unplaced carthalina Christoph, 1893

External links
Tentative Checklist of the Turkish Lepidoptera part 1
Tentative Checklist of the Turkish Lepidoptera part 2
Tentative Checklist of the Turkish Lepidoptera part 3
Fauna Europaea (European part of Turkey)

Turkey
Moths
Moths